The Flow Rate Technical Group is a group of scientists and engineers from the United States federal government, universities, and research institutions created May 19, 2010, for an official scientific-based estimate of the flow of oil in the Deepwater Horizon oil spill.  It issued an interim report on May 27.  It was convened again on June 10 by Coast Guard Admiral Thad Allen after the drilling riser from the well was cut by Maxx3 ROV Dive #35 on May 31, 2010, in an attempt to redirect the flow.  Large amounts of oil were not being captured and the group was convened to estimate how much.

Membership
The group is led by Marcia McNutt.

Members of the group are:
Bill Lehr, National Oceanic and Atmospheric Administration (Lead)
Alberto Aliseda, Assistant Professor of Mechanical Engineering, University of Washington
Paul Bommer, Senior Lecturer, Petroleum and Geosystems Engineering, University of Texas at Austin
Peter Cornillon, Professor of Oceanography, University of Rhode Island
Pedro Espina, National Institute of Standards and Technology
Juan Lasheras, Prof. of Engineering and Applied Sciences, University of California, San Diego
Ira Leifer, Assoc. Researcher, Marine Science Institute, University of California Santa Barbara
James Riley, Professor of Mechanical Engineering, University of Washington
Omer Savas, Professor of Mechanical Engineering, University of California Berkeley
Franklin Shaffer, Senior Research Engineer, National Energy Technology Laboratory, Department of Energy
Steve Wereley, Professor of Mechanical Engineering, Purdue University
Poojitha Yapa, Professor of Civil and Environmental Engineering, Clarkson University

Plume modeling
Uses video of the oil/gas mixture escaping from the damaged well, using particle image velocimetry analysis to estimate fluid velocity and flow volume.

Mass balance
Used remote sensing data from deployment of the Airborne Visible InfraRed Imaging Spectrometer (AVIRIS) and satellite imagery to calculate the amount of oil on the ocean surface for each day. The figures were corrected the value for oil evaporated, skimmed, burned, and dispersed up to that day and divided by time to produce an average rate.

 Victor Labson, Director, Crustal Geophysics and Geochemistry Science Center (lead)
 Roger N. Clark, Lead Scientist, Research Physical Scientist
 Gregg A. Swayze,  research geologist
 Todd M. Hoefen, research geophysicist
 Raymond Kokaly, research geophysicist
 K. Eric Livo, research geophysicist
 Michael H. Powers, research geophysicist
 Geoffrey S. Plumlee, research geologist
 Gregory P. Meeker, research geologist

Reservoir modeling 
Describes the geologic formations as well as composition and pressures of the oil, natural gas, and other compounds that are being released. Using open-hole logs; pressure, volume, and temperature data; core samples; and analog well or reservoir data; the team will populate computer models and determine flow rate from targeted sands in the well as a function of bottomhole pressure.

Don Maclay, Petroleum Engineer, MMS Gulf Regional Office (Lead)
Other MMS engineers

Nodal analysis
Uses input from reservoir modeling (including pressure, temperature, fluid composition and properties over time) and pressure and temperature conditions at the leak points on the sea floor, along with details of the geometries of the well, BOP, and riser to calculate fluid compositions, properties, and fluxes from both before and after riser removal.

George Guthrie, National Energy Technology Laboratory, Department of Energy (Lead)
Roger Aines, Lawrence Livermore National Laboratory, Department of Energy
Grant Bromhal, National Energy Technology Laboratory, Department of Energy
Roy Long, National Energy Technology Laboratory, Department of Energy
David Hetrick, Oak Ridge National Laboratory, Department of Energy
Bryan Morreale, National Energy Technology Laboratory, Department of Energy
Curt Oldenburg, Lawrence Berkeley National Laboratory, Department of Energy
Rajesh Pawar, Los Alamos National Laboratory, Department of Energy
Jud Virden, Pacific Northwest National Laboratory, Department of Energy

References

Deepwater Horizon oil spill